Arthur Pet was an English explorer. Together with Charles Jackman, he led an expedition for the Muscovy Company to discover the Northeast Passage in 1580.

Pet was in charge of the barque George, Jackman of the barque William. They were given orders to sail to Vardø, then along the north coast of Siberia which was expected to take less than 36 days in good conditions, and from there south to China.

On  they sailed from Harwich. On  the two ships separated off the coast of the Kola Peninsula due to steering difficulties of the William, and arranged to meet at Vaygach Island. This made them the first Western Europeans to penetrate into the Kara Sea. Pet reached as far as the bay of the Kara River where he met Jackman again. On the return journey, the ships were separated again. Both William and George reached Norway. Pet's journal includes a sketch of the Kara Sea by Hugh Smith.

References

Explorers of the Arctic